Harry Wayne Casey (born January 31, 1951), better known by his stage name KC, is an American musician, singer, songwriter, and record producer. He is best known for his band, KC and the Sunshine Band, as a producer of several hits for other artists, and as a pioneer of the disco genre of the 1970s.

Career 
Harry Wayne Casey formed KC and the Sunshine Band in 1973. He was introduced to Richard Finch, who was doing engineering work on records for TK Records. Thus began the Casey-Finch musical collaboration. The initial members were just Casey and Finch. They later added guitarist Jerome Smith (1953–2000) and drummer Robert Johnson, both TK studio musicians.

The first few songs, "Blow Your Whistle" (September 1973) and "Sound Your Funky Horn" (February 1974), were released as singles, and did well enough on the U.S. R&B chart and overseas that TK wanted a follow-up single and album. However, while working on demos for KC & the Sunshine Band the song, "Rock Your Baby" (George McCrae) was created. The band's "Queen of Clubs" was a hit in the UK, peaking at No. 7, and they went on tour there in 1975.

KC and the Sunshine Band became prominent in the United States in 1975 with "Get Down Tonight" and "That's the Way (I Like It)". Other Casey-Finch favorites include "(Shake, Shake, Shake) Shake Your Booty", "I'm Your Boogie Man", "Keep It Comin' Love" and "Please Don't Go". "Boogie Shoes" appeared on the soundtrack album for Saturday Night Fever. He also joined Teri DeSario on her hit "Yes, I'm Ready" in 1979. Casey also part-wrote "I Ain't Lyin'" (a UK hit for George McCrae in late 1975).

As a result of the soaring popularity of new wave and synthpop in the early 1980s, Casey dissolved the Sunshine Band and recorded several pop-oriented solo albums. In January 1981, he survived a serious car accident — another car hit his car head-on. He was left partially paralyzed for six months, and had to re-learn how to walk, dance, and play the piano, but by the end of the year he was back in the recording studio. "Give It Up", was released as a solo hit, shot to Number One in the UK (but his U.S. label, Epic, refused to release it). However, it became a Top 20 hit in the United States (1984) when issued on the independent Meca label. In the mid-1990s, due to the revived interest in the music and fashions of the 1970s, Casey re-formed the Sunshine Band.

Personal life 
Casey was born on January 31, 1951, at the Naval Hospital in Opa-locka, Florida. He grew up in Hialeah and graduated from Hialeah High School. In the 1990s and 2000s he split his time between Miami Lakes, Florida and Durham, North Carolina. He now lives in Miami Lakes.

Casey appeared in season 25 of Diners, Drive-Ins and Dives.

Discography 

Do It Good (1974)
KC and the Sunshine Band (1975)
The Sound of Sunshine (1975)
Part 3 (1976)
Who Do Ya Love (1978)
Do You Wanna Go Party (1979)
Space Cadet Solo Flight (1981)
The Painter (1981)
All in a Night's Work (1982)
KC Ten (1983)
Oh Yeah! (1993)
I'll Be There for You (2001)
Yummy (2007)

Selected compilations 
Greatest Hits, Vol. 1 (1980) (compilation)
The Best of KC and the Sunshine Band (1990) (compilation)
Greatest Hits Vol. 2 (1990) (compilation)
KC and the Sunshine Band...and More (1994)
Part 3... and More (1995)
Get Down Live! (1995) (live)
Shake, Shake, Shake and Other Hits (1997)
I'm Your Boogie Man and Other Hits (1997)
Yummy in My Tummy (1998) (live)

As songwriter 
Songwriter: Harry Wayne Casey & Richard Finch
Rock Your Baby (1974) -  George McCrae, Pop #1
Dance Across the Floor (1978) - Jimmy "Bo" Horne
Get Happy (1978) - Jimmy "Bo" Horne
Gimme Some (1978) - Jimmy "Bo" Horne
I Wanna Go Home with You (1978)  - Jimmy "Bo" Horne 
Don't Worry about It (1978) - Jimmy "Bo" Horne
It's Your Sweet Love (1978) - Jimmy "Bo" Horne
Let Me (1978) - Jimmy "Bo" Horne
Ask the Birds and the Bees (1978) - Jimmy "Bo" Horne
You Get Me Hot (1979) - Jimmy "Bo" Horne
Goin Home for Love(Foster/Casey/Finch/Horne) (1979)  - Jimmy "Bo" Horne 
I Get Lifted (1979)  - Jimmy "Bo" Horne 
Without You (1979)  - Jimmy "Bo" Horne

See also 
TK Records
Henry Stone
Hamilton Bohannon

References

External links 

Official website
Band history
Harry Casey Interview NAMM Oral History Library (2017)

1951 births
American disco singers
American funk singers
American male pop singers
American male singer-songwriters
Record producers from Florida
American rhythm and blues singer-songwriters
Epic Records artists
Grammy Award winners
KC and the Sunshine Band members
Living people
Miami Dade College alumni
People from Opa-locka, Florida
Singer-songwriters from Florida
Hialeah Senior High School alumni